María Elba Garfias Maldonado (born 24 August 1968) is a Mexican politician affiliated with the Party of the Democratic Revolution. As of 2014 she served as Deputy of the LIX Legislature of the Mexican Congress representing the Federal District.

References

1968 births
Living people
People from Mexico City
Women members of the Chamber of Deputies (Mexico)
Party of the Democratic Revolution politicians
Deputies of the LIX Legislature of Mexico
Members of the Chamber of Deputies (Mexico) for Mexico City